Actinotia is a genus of moths of the family Noctuidae.

The name Actinotia is derived from the Greek words akte (important or high place) and noton (backside), referring to the plume at the back of the body.

Species
 Actinotia australis Holloway, 1989
 Actinotia conjuncta (Püngeler, 1900)
 Actinotia gnorima (Püngeler, 1907)
 Actinotia intermediata (Bremer, 1861)
 Actinotia polyodon – purple cloud (Clerck, 1759)
 Actinotia radiosa (Esper, [1804])
 Actinotia stevenswani Hreblay, Peregovits & Ronkay, 1999

References
 Actinotia at Markku Savela's Lepidoptera and Some Other Life Forms
 Natural History Museum Lepidoptera genus database

Hadeninae
Noctuoidea genera
Taxa named by Jacob Hübner